(stylized as BuchMarkt, English: Book market) is an independent specialist magazine founded in 1966 for the German-language book trade. It is published monthly, usually on the first Tuesday of the month.

History 
In 1966, the idea arose to publish an independent specialist magazine for the German-language book trade. On 10 May 1966, Klaus Werner, Eberhardt Dickert and Christian von Zittwitz founded the publishing house  for this purpose. The first issue was presented in 1966 at the Frankfurt Book Fair.

In the beginning,  was published in two editions, but increased every year. In 1967, there were already four issues, in 1968 six, eight the following year, ten in 1970; and since 1971  has been published monthly.

Christian von Zittwitz is now the sole shareholder and in 1997 relocated the company's headquarters from Düsseldorf to Meerbusch-.

In 2009, Christian von Zittwitz was the first journalist ever to receive the golden pin of honor from the Börsenverein des Deutschen Buchhandels.

Initiatives 
The "Buchmarkt AWARD" has been presented annually at the Leipzig Book Fair since 2000.

Every year since 2003,  has honored the "Bookstore of the Year": a company in the German-speaking region that offers competent advice, a balanced range of goods, imaginative presentation and good marketing as well as economic success.

Cooperations 

Publisher of the year 
Since 1994,  has been awarding a "Publisher of the year" prize.
The winners were:

 1994:  (arsEdition)
 1995: Michael Krüger (Carl Hanser Verlag)
 1996: 
 1997: 
 1998:  (Piper Verlag)
 1999: 
 2000:  (Deutscher Taschenbuch Verlag)
 2001: 
 2002: 
 2003:  (Zabert Sandmann Verlag)
 2004: 
 2005:  (Kiepenheuer & Witsch)
 2006: 
 2007: 
 2008:  (S. Fischer Verlag)
 2009:  (Carlsen Verlag)
 2010:  (Heyne Verlag)
 2011:  (Verlag C.H. Beck)
 2012: 
 2013:  (Droemer Knaur)
 2014: Georg Reuchlein (Luchterhand Literaturverlag)
 2015: 
 2016: 
 2017: Andreas Rötzer
 2018: 
 2019: 
 2020: 
 2021: Regina Kammerer (Luchterhand Literaturverlag)

See also 
 Börsenblatt

References

External links 
 Official website
 BuchmarktFORUM

Publications established in 1966
German-language magazines
Magazines about the media
Bookselling